Costoanachis rudyi is a species of sea snail, a marine gastropod mollusk in the family Columbellidae, the dove snails. Can be found in the Guanahacabibes peninsula of Cuba

Description

Distribution

References

External links

Columbellidae
Gastropods described in 2006